Maud Galtier (21 April 1913 — 7 April 2014) was a French tennis player.

Biography
Galtier, a native of Toulon, began competing in the 1940s and was originally known by her maiden name Maud Mottez. She won France's national singles championship title in 1954 and was a two-time winner of the French Covered Court Championships. Partnering Suzanne Schmitt, she made the women's doubles final of the 1954 French Championships, which they lost in three sets to Maureen Connolly and Nell Hall Hopman. Her vision was limited during the match as she had sat on her glasses on a changeover. Galtier, who used an underarm serve, continued to feature at the French Championships into the 1960s after she had become a grandmother. She lived to 100.

Grand Slam tournament finals

Doubles: 1 (1 runner-up)

References

1913 births
2014 deaths
French female tennis players
Sportspeople from Toulon
French centenarians